Jan Dieteren (born 12 April 1993) is a German cyclist, who currently rides for German amateur team RSV Kempten.

In early 2016, he was diagnosed with testicular cancer. Because of this, he did not compete during the 2016 season, but resumed competition in April 2017. Dieteren failed to finish any races in 2017 either.

Major results

2010
 2nd Time trial, National Junior Road Championships
2012
 1st Stage 3 Thüringen Rundfahrt der U23
2013
 1st Stage 2 Thüringen Rundfahrt der U23
 9th Sparkassen Münsterland Giro
 10th Kernen Omloop Echt-Susteren
2014
 4th Overall Tour de Taiwan
 8th Rund um den Finanzplatz Eschborn–Frankfurt
 8th La Côte Picarde
2015
 3rd La Roue Tourangelle
 4th Kernen Omloop Echt-Susteren
 7th Antwerpse Havenpijl
 8th La Côte Picarde
 9th De Kustpijl

References

External links

1993 births
Living people
German male cyclists
People from Bergstraße (district)
Sportspeople from Darmstadt (region)
Cyclists from Hesse